is a retired Japanese tennis player.  She competed in singles in the French Open twice and in the U.S. Open once.  Competing with her sister Kazuko Sawamatsu in ladies doubles, she reached the quarterfinals of Wimbledon in 1970, losing to eventual champions Rosie Casals and Billie Jean King.

She competed for the Japanese Federation Cup team in 1970 and 1971.

Sawamatsu is the mother of professional tennis player Naoko Sawamatsu.

External links
 
 
 

1948 births
Japanese female tennis players
Universiade medalists in tennis
Living people
Universiade silver medalists for Japan
Medalists at the 1970 Summer Universiade
20th-century Japanese women
21st-century Japanese women